"Regret" is a song by British alternative rock band New Order. It was released on 5 April 1993 as the lead single from their sixth studio album, Republic (1993). Stephen Hague is credited as both the producer and as a co-writer. It was the band's first single released on CentreDate Co Ltd (through London Records) following the collapse of Factory Records.

The song was a critical and commercial success, reaching the top 10 in Canada, Ireland, Portugal and the United Kingdom. It peaked at number 28 on the US Billboard Hot 100—New Order's highest placement on that chart—and reached number one on two other Billboard charts. Peter Care directed a music video for the song; the video appears on the "Regret" promotional VHS, as well as a DVD collection.

Release
The single was released worldwide in a variety of formats. The B-side of the single differed in the various releases, but all were remixes of the A-side, including the "Fire Island Mix", and "Junior Dub" by Pete Heller and Terry Farley, and two Sabres of Paradise mixes.

Critical reception
In 2010 Pitchfork Media included the song at number 34 on their Top 200 Tracks of the 90s. Tom Ewing of Freaky Trigger also named it his 37th favourite single of the 1990s. John Bush of AllMusic described it "as sublime a balance of obtuse lyrics, just barely emoted vocals, vague club leanings, and grooving synth melodics as their classic material." Peter Hook has said that "Regret" was the "last good New Order song".

Chart performance
The song reached number four on the UK Singles Chart, the last time the band had a top five hit. "Regret" also peaked at number 28 on the US Billboard Hot 100, thus becoming the band's highest-charting single in the United States. The song also appeared on several other charts in the US, including two terms at number one on the Modern Rock Tracks chart (now the Alternative Songs chart). During its second term at number one on the Modern Rock Tracks chart, "Regret" also topped the Hot Dance Music/Club Play chart on the strength of its remixes. At the end of 1993, the song came in at number one on the Modern Rock Tracks' year-end chart. On Canada's RPM Top Singles chart, the song debuted at number 80 on 15 May 1993 and climbed to its peak of number six on 3 July, staying there for two weeks and spending six weeks in the top 10. It also reached number five on the RPM Dance chart on 17 July.

Live performances
In 1993 New Order filmed a live performance of the song for Top of the Pops in Venice Beach, California as part of an episode of the hit TV series Baywatch, featuring David Hasselhoff and various background actors and bikini-clad actresses dancing and playing on the beach. The band's performance was directed by notable music video and feature film director Thomas Mignone and was broadcast via satellite to the United Kingdom.

Track listings

Charts

Weekly charts

Year-end charts

Cover versions
The song was covered by the American rock band The Get Up Kids and released on their compilation album Eudora in 2001. It was also covered by Greek synthpop band Marsheaux on their 2006 album Peekaboo. Previously it was covered by The Afghan Whigs. The band started playing the song live around 1994 and subsequently recorded it during the making of their 1996 album Black Love. The latter was included on the 2016 re-release called Black Love (20th Anniversary Edition).

In popular culture
The video for "Regret" appears in the PSP game Lumines II.

The American Television Show 13 Reasons Why features this song in the Original Soundtrack for the third season.

See also
 List of number-one dance singles of 1993 (U.S.)
 Number one modern rock hits of 1993

References

External links
 
 

1992 songs
1993 singles
London Records singles
New Order (band) songs
Qwest Records singles
Song recordings produced by Stephen Hague
Songs written by Bernard Sumner
Songs written by Gillian Gilbert
Songs written by Peter Hook
Songs written by Stephen Hague
Songs written by Stephen Morris (musician)
British alternative rock songs